Heteralepas is a genus of goose barnacles in the  family Heteralepadidae. which was first described in 1907 by Henry Augustus Pilsbry.

Species
The World Register of Marine Species includes the following species in the genus :

 Heteralepas adiposa Zevina, 1982
 Heteralepas belli (Gruvel, 1902)
 Heteralepas canci Chan, Tsang & Shih, 2012
 Heteralepas cantelli Buhl-Mortensen & Newman, 2004
 Heteralepas cornuta (Darwin, 1851)
 Heteralepas cygnus Pilsbry, 1907
 Heteralepas fulva Zevina, 1982
 Heteralepas gettysburgensis Lobo & Tuaty-Guerra, 2017
 Heteralepas gigas (Annandale, 1905)
 Heteralepas hataii Zevina, 1982
 Heteralepas indica Gruvel,
 Heteralepas japonica (Aurivillius, 1892)
 Heteralepas lankesteri (Gruvel, 1900)
 Heteralepas luridas Zevina, 1982
 Heteralepas microstoma (Gruvel, 1901)
 Heteralepas mystacophora Newman, 1964
 Heteralepas newmani Buhl-Mortensen & Mifsud, 2017
 Heteralepas nicobarica Annandale, 1909
 Heteralepas ovalis (Hoek, 1907)
 Heteralepas rex (Pilsbry, 1907)
 Heteralepas segonzaci Young, 2001
 Heteralepas smilius Ren, 1983
 Heteralepas tenuis (Hoek, 1907)
 Heteralepas utinomii Newman, 1960
 Heteralepas vetula Pilsbry, 1909

References

Barnacles
Taxa named by Henry Augustus Pilsbry